The hurdy-gurdy is a musical instrument.

Hurdy-gurdy may also refer to:

Hurdy Gurdy (band), a rock band active in the 1960s
Hurdy Gurdy (film), a 1929 cartoon by Walter Lantz for the Oswald the Lucky Rabbit shorts
The Hurdy Gurdy, a mid-1760s symphony in E flat written by Joseph Schmitt
The Hurdy-Gurdy, a 1902 book by Laura E. Richards
Hurdy-gurdy, a 1905 painting by Pablo Picasso
The Hurdy-Gurdy, a 1909 book of prose, poetry and drama by Elena Guro 
Hurdy Gurdy, a 1929 film featuring Ann Brody and Max Davidson
The Hurdy Gurdy, a 1930 play by Andrei Platonov
Hurdy-Gurdy, a 1944 book of poetry by Nancy Price
The Hurdy-Gurdy (Φτώχεια και Φιλότιμο), a 1955 film by Alekos Sakellarios
"Hurdy Gurdy", a track by Malcolm Clarke for the 1979 album BBC Radiophonic Workshop – 21
 Hurdy-gurdy, in Australia (esp. SA) a carousel

See also
Hurdy Gurdy Man (disambiguation)
Herdy Gerdy, a 2002 game for the PlayStation 2